Talen may also refer to:

 Talen (name) includes list of people with the name Talen
 Talen, Rajgarh, village in Madhya Pradesh, India
 Transcription activator-like effector nuclease (TALEN)
 Talen Energy, an energy company
 Royal Talens, an art supplies company

See also
 Talon (disambiguation)
 Taal (disambiguation), the singular form of the Dutch/Afrikaans word talen
 Talin (disambiguation)